This is a list of chiefs of the Seminole, which includes military and civic leaders of the Seminole people, who today are enrolled in the Miccosukee Tribe of Indians of Florida, Seminole Nation of Oklahoma, and Seminole Tribe of Florida

Leading chiefs (1750–1849) 

There were four leading chiefs of the Seminole, a Native American tribe that formed in what was then Spanish Florida in present-day United States. They were leaders between the time the tribe organized in the mid-18th century until Micanopy and many Seminole were removed to Indian Territory in the 1830s following the Second Seminole War.

Cowkeeper, 1750-1783
King Payne, 1783-1812
Bolek, 1812-1819
Micanopy, 1819-1849

Miccosukee Tribe of Indians of Florida 
The Miccosukee Tribe of Indians of Florida were recognized by the state of Florida in 1957, and gained federal recognition in 1962 as the Miccosukee Tribe of Indians of Florida.

 ca. late 18th c.–1819: Kinache, also Kinhagee (ca. 1750–ca. 1819), the last chief of the Creek of Miccosukee, Florida, who was defeated in battle in 1818 by US forces commanded by General Andrew Jackson. Later Kinhagee's people migrated south, maintaining their local village name Miccosukee as the name of the tribe.
 1962–1985: William Buffalo Tiger, also Buffalo Tiger or Heenehatche, (1920–2015), first chief of the Miccosukee Tribe of Indians of Florida, led initiatives for self-determination
 1986–2011: Billy Cypress, tribal chairman
 2011–2015: Colley Billie, tribal chairman, ousted in 2015
 2015–2016: Roy Cypress Jr., interim tribal chairman
 2015–present: Billy Cypress,

Seminole Nation of Oklahoma 
 1819–1849: Micanopy (ca. 1780–ca. 1849)
 1849–: John Jumper (ca. 1820–1896), chief of Confederate faction of Seminole
 1882–1885: John Jumper, chief
 1866–1881: John Chupco (ca. 1821–1881), town chief, leader of Union faction of Seminoles, Hvteyievike Band
 1885–1901: John F. Brown (1842–1919), governor, Tiger clan
 1905–1919: John F. Brown, governor
 1922–1935: Alice Brown Davis (1852–1935), chief
 1935–1936: Chili Fish, chief
 1936–1946: George Jones, chief
 1942–1944: Willie Haney, chief
 1944–1946: Jeffie Brown, principal chief
 1948–1952: George Harjo (1886–1952), chief, Tvsekayv Haco Band, Bear Clan
 1952–1954: Marcy Cully, Nokuse (1910–1954), chief
 1955–1950: Phillip Walker, chief
 1960–1969: John A. Brown, principal chief
 1969–1972: Terry Walker, chief
 1972–1973: Floyd Harjo, chief
 1973–1977: Edwin Tanyan, chief
 1977–1978: Richmond Tiger, chief
 1978–1981: Tom Palmer, chief
 1979–1985: James Milam, principal chief
 1985–1989: Edwin Tanyan, chief
 1989–2001: Jerry Haney, principal chief
 2003–2005 : Kenneth Edwards Chambers, principal chief
 2005–2009: Enoch Kelly Haney, principal chief
 2009–2017: Leonard M. Harjo, principal chief
 2017–Present: Greg P. Chilcoat, principal chief, Tusekia Harjo Band and Deer Clan

Seminole Tribe of Florida 
 1957–1966: Billy Osceola, inaugural holder.
 1967–1971: Betty Mae Tiger Jumper, first and only chairwoman of the tribe, editor-in-chief of the Seminole Tribune, tribal communications director, and the last matriarch of the Snake clan. Jumper spoke English, Mikasuki, and Muskogee.
 1971–1979: Howard Tommie, political leader and two-term chairman of Seminole Tribal Council who initiated programs in the 1970s, including accepting the U.S. land claim settlement; successfully negotiated with the State of Florida for water rights for the Seminole reservations, and establishment of tax-free smoke shops and high-stakes bingo as revenue generators. Tommie speaks English, Mikasuki, and Muskogee.
 1979–2003: Jim Billie, suspended in 2001, officially removed in 2003. Billie chaired during an expansion of Indian gaming and increase in tribal wealth and economic development.
 2003–2011: Mitchell Cypress
 2011–2016: Jim Billie, re-elected and again removed by Seminole Tribal Council in a unanimous vote (4–0) on account of "various issues with policies and procedures of the Chairman's office."
 2016–present: Marcellus Osceola Jr.

References 

 
Titles and offices of Native American leaders
Lists of Native American people
Native American leaders